The Brand-Lochryn Tournament was a professional golf tournament played in England between 1946 and 1948. In its first year it was held in the weeks lead up to The Open Championship. The prize money was £1,500. Brand-Lochryn was a make of notepaper sold by tournament sponsors, "R. A. Brand & Co.". The 1948 event was called the R A Brand Tournament.

Winners

References

Golf tournaments in England
Recurring sporting events established in 1946
Recurring events disestablished in 1948
1946 establishments in England
1948 disestablishments in England